George Frederick Eastman (7 April 1903 – 15 March 1991) was an English cricketer.  Eastman was a right-handed batsman who played as a specialist wicket-keeper.  He was born at Leyton, Essex.

Eastman made his first-class debut for Essex in the 1926 County Championship against Nottinghamshire.  He made 47 further first-class appearances for the county, the last of which came against Surrey in the 1929 County Championship.  In his 48 appearances he scored 261 runs at an average of 6.86, with a high score of 34 not out.  Behind the stumps he took 29 catches and made 21 stumpings.  With Roy Sheffield and Tom Wade queueing up to take the gloves, as well as being superior batsman, Eastman found himself forced out of the Essex team and left the county at the end of the 1929 season.

He died at Upperton, Sussex on 15 March 1991.  He was the brother of Essex all-rounder Laurie Eastman.

References

External links
George Eastman at ESPNcricinfo
George Eastman at CricketArchive

1903 births
1991 deaths
People from Leyton
English cricketers
Essex cricketers
Wicket-keepers